Enzo Paleni (born 30 May 2002) is a French professional racing cyclist, who currently rides for UCI WorldTeam .

Career
In stage 1 of the Giro della Valle d'Aosta Paleni spent the day in the breakaway getting caught by teammate Lenny Martinez on the major hill. Paleni rode in the 2022 European Road Championships finishing in sixth place in the Under-23 Time trial.
On 3 August 2022  confirmed they had signed Paleni into their UCI WorldTeam for 2023.

Major results
Sources:
2019
 1st Stage 2a (TTT) Aubel–Thimister–Stavelot
 7th Chrono des Nations
2020
 2nd Overall Grand Prix Rüebliland
2021
 4th Chrono des Nations
2022
 1st  Overall Le Triptyque des Monts et Châteaux
 1st  Mountains classification, Tour de la Mirabelle
 2nd  Time trial, Mediterranean Games
 3rd Overall Ronde de l'Isard
 6th Grand Prix de la Somme
2023
 9th Grand Prix La Marseillaise

References

External links

2002 births
Living people
French male cyclists
Mediterranean Games silver medalists for France
Competitors at the 2022 Mediterranean Games